Alicia is a feminine given name. It is  a variant of Alice, which comes from the Germanic name Adalheidis (Adelaide), meaning "noble natured" (noble of kind).

Notable people with the name include:

 Alicia Albe (born 1977), American rhythmic gymnast
 Alicia Alonso (1920–2019) Cuban dancer
 Alicia Amatriain (born 1980), Spanish ballet dancer
 Alicia Appleman-Jurman (1930–2017), Polish memoirist of the Holocaust
 Alicia Arango (born 1958), Colombian politician and businesswoman
 Alicia Ashley (born 1967), Jamaican boxer
 Alicia Austin (born 1942), American fantasy and science fiction artist and illustrator
 Alicia Austria-Martinez (born 1940), Filipina judge
 Alicia Bárcena Ibarra (born 1952), Mexican United-Nations official
 Alicia Barney (born 1952), Colombian artist 
 Alicia Barrancos (born 1972), Argentine freestyle swimmer
 Alicia Boscatto (born 1960), Argentine breaststroke swimmer
 Alicia Bridges (born 1953), American pop singer
 Alicia Bruzzo (1945–2007), Argentine actress
 Alicia Cárdeñas (born 1943), Mexican volleyball player
 Alicia Castro (born 1949), Argentine diplomat
 Alicia Beatriz Casullo (1940–2019), Argentine psychoanalyst
 Alicia Chacón (born 1938), American politician
 Alicia Coppola (born 1968), American actress
 Alicia Coutts (born 1987), Australian medley, butterfly and freestyle swimmer
 Alicia Cuarón (born 1939), Mexican-American educator and human rights activist
 Alicia Delibes (born 1950), Spanish politician and teacher
 Alicia Drake (born 1968), British fashion journalist
 Alicia Ferguson (born 1981), Australian football (soccer) player
 Alicia Foster, better known as Jodie Foster, American actress
 Alicia Fox (born 1986), American model and professional wrestler
 Alicia Fulford-Wierzbicki, New Zealand actress
 Alicia García-Salcedo González (1903–2003), Asturian lawyer
 Alicia Garza (born 1981), American civil rights activist
 Alicia Gaspar de Alba (born 1958), Mexican-American academic and poet
 Alicia Gironella D'Angeli (born 1931), Mexican chef
 Alicia Goranson (born 1974), American actress
 Alicia Gorey (born 1981), Australian news presenter and reporter
 Alicia Graf Mack (born 1979), American dancer
 Alicia Hall (born 1985), American model
 Alicia K. Harris, Canadian director and screenwriter
 Alicia Herrera Rivera (1928-2013), Chilean feminist lawyer
 Alicia Hollowell (born 1984), American softball player
 Alicia Iturrioz (1927–2021), Spanish portraitist and painter
 Alicia Kearns (born 1987), British politician
 Alicia Keys (born 1981), American R&B singer and pianist
 Alicia Killaly (1836–1908), Canadian watercolour painter
 Alicia Kirchner (born 1946), Argentine politician
 Alicia Koplowitz, Marquise of Bellavista (born 1952), Spanish businesswoman
 Alicia Kozameh (born 1953), Argentine author
 Alicia de Larrocha (1923–2009), Spanish pianist
 Alicia Liu (born c. 1980), Taiwanese model
 Alicia Luciano (born 1983), title-holder of Miss New Jersey 2002
 Alicia Machado (born 1976), former Miss Universe 1996 from Venezuela
 Alicia Markova (1910–2004), British dancer
 Alicia Mastandrea, Argentine politician
 Alicia Mayer (born 1976), Filipina model and actress
 Alicia Minshew (born 1974), American actress
 Alicia Molik (born 1981), Australian tennis Player
 Alicia Gómez Montano (1955–2020), Spanish journalist
 Alecia Moore, better known as Pink, American pop singer
 Alicia Moreda (1912–1985), Puerto-Rican soap-opera actress
 Alicia Morton (born 1987), American actress
 Alicia Ostriker (born 1937), American Jewish, feminist poet
 Alicia Parla (1914–1998), Cuban rhumba dancer
 Alicia Parlette (1982–2010), American journalist and cancer survivor
 Alicia Partnoy (born 1955), Argentine human-rights activist
 Alicia Patterson (1906–1963), American newspaper editor
 Alicia O'Shea Petersen (1862–1923), Tasmanian suffragist and social reformer
 Alicia Reece (born 1971), member of the Ohio House of Representatives
 Alicia Rhett (1916–2014), American actress and portrait painter
 Alicia Rickter (born 1972), American model, actress and Playboy playmate
 Alicia Rio (born 1971), Mexican-American pornographic actress
 Alicia Rodriguez (born 1935), Spanish actress
 Alicia Sacramone (born 1987), American gymnast
 Alicia Sánchez (born 1948), Peruvian volleyball player
 Alicia Sánchez-Camacho (born 1967), Spanish politician
 Alicia Shepard (born 1953), American journalist
 Alicia Smith (born 1984), South Africa cricketer
 Alicia Silverstone (born 1976), American actress
 Alicia Sorell (born 1975), also known as Alicia Lorén, American actress famous for appearing with her identical twin Annie Sorell
 Alicia Boole Stott (1860–1940), Irish mathematician
 Alicia Thompson (born 1976), American basketball player
 Alicia Vélez (born 1999), Mexican voice actor
 Alicia Vergel (1927–1993), Filipina actress
 Alicia Vikander (born 1987), Swedish actress and dancer
 Alicia Villarreal (born 1974), Mexican singer
 Alicia Vitarelli (born 1978), American television-news correspondent
 Alicia Warrington (born 1980), American drummer
 Alicia Webb (born 1979), American wrestler
 Alicia Witt (born 1975), American actress

Fictional characters 
 Alicia, the protagonist in Thomas Hardy's short story "Alicia's Diary"
 Alicia, the protagonist in the videogame Bullet Witch
 Alicia, the protagonist in the videogame Valkyrie Profile 2: Silmeria
 Alicia, choir member in the 2003 film School of Rock
 Alicia, daughter of Inés in the 2006 film Goya's Ghosts
 Alicia Abshire, sister of the title character in The Time Traveler's Wife
 Alicia Alarcon, a protagonist in the TV series Gran Hotel
 Alecia Alcott in the TV series All About Us
 Alicia Baker in the television series Smallville (season 3) 
 Alicia Botti in the children's television series Thomas the Tank Engine and Friends
 Alicia Clark in the television series Fear the Walking Dead
 Alicia Fennel in the television series Veronica Mars
 Alicia Florence in the manga Aria
 Alicia Florrick, the protagonist in the television series The Good Wife
 Alicia Masters in Marvel Comics
 Alicia McGuire, an American woman searching for her lost son in The Power of Five series
 Alicia Melchiott, the main female protagonist in the video game Valkyria Chronicles
 Alicia Rivera, the beta of Massie in The Clique
 Alicia the Snow Queen Fairy, a character from the book series Rainbow Magic (originally named Alyssa the Snow Queen Fairy)
 Alicia Testarossa in Magical Girl Lyrical Nanoha
 Alicia Winston, playable character in video game Time Crisis 3
 Alicia Charlotte, a character in the anime Aikatsu Friends!

See also
 Alisha, Alysha, Alycia, and Leisha, variant spellings or variant forms of the name
 Ana Alicia (born 1956), Mexican actress with this surname
 Alicia (disambiguation), other meanings

References

English feminine given names
Filipino feminine given names
Spanish feminine given names
Feminine given names